Marcel Céline Gerard Edgard Vanthilt  (born 24 August 1957) is a Belgian singer and television presenter.

Early life
Marcel Vanthilt was born on 24 August 1957, in Lommel, Belgium. After attending high school, Marcel studied at the Vrije Universiteit Brussel and attained a bachelor's degree in political sciences. He came to Brussels because he knew the VRT had offices there. He didn't know at the time there was something like a drama school, like St.-Lukas in Brussels. In 1977, during his spell at the university, he discovered Punk.

Musical career

Arbeid Adelt!
Marcel Vanthilt rose to fame with his group 'Arbeid Adelt!' (literally: "Labor ennobles"), formed in 1981. He provided vocals and played keyboard for the group, singing mainly in Dutch. They made 2 EPs ('Jonge Helden' and 'Le chagrin en Quatre-vingt') and scored minor hits with 'De Dag dat het zonlicht...' and 'Lekker Westers'. Despite the initial success, the group decided to split. One year later, they reformed, only to split again after releasing one single ('Stroom'). The reason behind this was the discontent of the group with their record label, and also differing opinions between the group members about the future of the band. Vanthilt noted the following comment: "They saw us as a kind of clowns. They refused to bring out the songs that were representative of what we were doing, and released "Stroom" en "Witte kom hie". Those were both good jokes, good for a laugh at the live gigs, but not good as a release two years after your last record."

In 1991 the group got together again and got a deal from Virgin Records. This resulted in their first full CD, 'Des Duivels Oorkussen'. However, they were not able to break through commercially.

In 1996 he also recorded the song "I Shoot Dikke Jo" with the Tuvan throat singing ensemble Huun-Huur-Tu.

Other
Vanthilt tried to gain musical fame with two other groups: "The Yéh-yéhs" and "Groep Z"(in 2004). Both stints were unsuccessful.

He also designed the album cover of Clouseau's record En Dans (2001).

Television career

VPRO

In the early 1980s Vanthilt worked for VPRO on Dutch television. One of the projects he worked on was the presentation of Big Fun in the Big Town (1986), a documentary about Hip hop music, credited for making the genre very popular in the Netherlands. It became available on DVD in 2012.

MTV VJ
From 1987 to 1990, Vanthilt lived in London. There he became a VJ for the new music station MTV Europe. His most famous programme there was "Cokes & Vanthilt", which he presented in co-operation with Ray Cokes. The two got together again on New Year's Eve 2008 for a one time show on Belgian network Canvas.

United States
From 1996 to 1998, Vanthilt moved to the United States, in pursuit of his wife. He tried to launch an acting career, but was ultimately unsuccessful. He can be seen as an extra in an episode of Friends (S3E17). After he divorced his wife, he returned to Belgium. He also wrote columns and was reporter for the magazine Panorama. He bundled his columns in a book, called Ha!Merika! and also adapted it to a theatre show.

Belgian TV and radio career
From 1998 onwards, Vanthilt became involved with the media in Belgium, mostly on Flemish radiostation Studio Brussel and TV-station Eén. On TV, he hosted various shows, such as quizzes ('Quix', 'ViaVia', 'De lage Landen'). His most famous quiz was perhaps 'Tien voor Taal', a language-centered quiz, which he co-hosted with Dutch presenter Anita Witzier. He had a short stint with vtm, for which he hosted 'Tilt' (1993–1995), but soon returned to the VRT. He further hosted reality show "Wit in Vegas" (2005), in which he accompanied couples wanting to get married in Las Vegas. On 26 November 2005, Vanthilt co-hosted the Junior Eurovision Song Conteset with Maureen Louys. In recent years, Vanthilt has appeared on screen as a talkshow host. From 2006 to 2009 he appeared as a weekly guest in late night talkshow "De laatste show". He continued on to host the summer talkshow Zomer 2007 and Zomer 2008, in alternation with Ben Crabbé. Since 2009 he has his own summer talkshow, Villa Vanthilt. These shows are recorded in a makeshift studio in a Flemish city. In 2009, the cities chosen were Ghent and Hasselt; in 2010 Hasselt and Kortrijk. He has since started the 2011-season of Villa Vanthilt, five weeks in Dendermonde and five weeks in Roeselare. His program is scheduled to run to the end of August. Since 2009, Vanthilt also hosts Ook getest op mensen, a TV show mainly focusing on health related consumer issues (Eén).

His most important radio show was "Was het nu 70, 80 of 90" (Was it 70, 80 or 90?), but he also hosted the "Album 100".

Notes

20th-century Belgian male singers
20th-century Belgian singers
Living people
Belgian radio presenters
Belgian rock singers
Belgian pop singers
English-language singers from Belgium
Belgian game show hosts
Belgian television talk show hosts
VJs (media personalities)
Album-cover and concert-poster artists
People from Lommel
1957 births
21st-century Belgian male singers
21st-century Belgian singers
Vrije Universiteit Brussel alumni